Oleg was a Rurikid ruler of the Drevlians from 969 to his death in 977. He was the second son of Sviatoslav I of Kiev.

Date of birth is not known, but is probably before 957. Sviatoslav split up his domains, and gave the Drevlyan lands to Oleg.  Oleg and his brother Yaropolk went to war after their father's death.  According to Primary chronicle, Oleg killed Lyut, the son of Yaropolk's chief adviser and military commander Sveneld, when he hunted in the Drevlyan lands which Oleg regarded as his own. In an act of revenge and at the insistence of Sveneld, Yaropolk went to war against his brother Oleg and killed him in Ovruch. Oleg was killed incidentally on the run in moat, and Yaropolk did regret this.  Then, Yaropolk sent his men to Novgorod, from which his other brother Vladimir had fled on receiving the news about Oleg's death. Yaropolk became the sole ruler of Rus'.

In 1044 Yaroslav I the Wise had Oleg's bones exhumed, christened, and reburied in the Church of the Tithes.

Possible descendants 

There is a Czech legend (mentioned by  Jan Amos Komenský (in Spis o rodu Žerotínů), Bartosz Paprocki  and Bohuslav Balbín, among others), that the noble House of Zierotin descends from a certain Oleg of Rus (see :ru:Олег Моравский for details).

References

Year of birth missing
Rurik dynasty
10th-century princes in Kievan Rus'
977 deaths
Burials at the Church of the Tithes